Zou, originally Zhu or Zhulou, was a minor state that existed during the Zhou dynasty of ancient China.

History

King Wu of Zhou granted Cao Xie (曹挾) control of the small state of Zhu as a vassal ruler under the State of Lu with the feudal title Viscount (子), but later holding the title Duke of Zhu (邾公).  The ancestral surname of the ruling family was Cao (曹).

During the reign of Duke Mu of Lu (417–377), Zhu's name was changed to Zou. The state of Zou was located in the southwest of modern-day Shandong Province.  Its territory is now the county-level city of Zoucheng.

Demise
Zou was conquered and annexed by the state of Chu during the reign of King Xuan of Chu (r. 369–340 BC). The people of Zou and their descendants adopted the Zhu (朱) or Zou as their surnames.

Legacy
Zhu (朱), without the radical, is one of the most common surnames of modern-day China. Another, albeit less common surname Zou (鄒/邹) is also derived from the former name of the state.

The noted Neo-Confucian Zhu Xi descends from the ruling house.  The small state of Zou, however, is most famous as the birthplace of the Chinese philosopher Mencius.  As the overlord State of Lu was the home state of Confucius and many of his disciples, this means that Confucianism's founder, and most of its minor sages and wise men hailed from or had ancestral roots in these two ancient states of China.

See also 
 Xiao Zhu

References

Ancient Chinese states
4th-century BC disestablishments in China
States and territories disestablished in the 4th century BC
11th-century BC establishments in China
States and territories established in the 11th century BC